Pratt is a city in and the county seat of Pratt County, Kansas, United States.  As of the 2020 census, the population of the city was 6,603. It is home to Pratt Community College.

History

19th century
Pratt was founded in 1884 and named after Caleb S. Pratt, a young Civil War officer from the Kansas Infantry, who was killed in the Battle of Wilson's Creek near Springfield, Missouri The first post office in Pratt was established in June 1884.

In 1887, the Chicago, Kansas and Nebraska Railway built a main line from Herington to Pratt.  In 1888, this line was extended to Liberal.  Later, it was extended to Tucumcari, New Mexico and El Paso, Texas.  It foreclosed in 1891 and was taken over by Chicago, Rock Island and Pacific Railway, which shut down in 1980 and reorganized as St. Louis and Southwestern "Cotton Belt" Railroad, a subsidiary of Southern Pacific Railroad which merged in 1996 with Union Pacific.  Most locals still refer to this railroad as the "Rock Island".

20th century
Built in 1930, Hotel Roberts is the largest and most highly styled historic hotel in Pratt. Construction of the hotel was initiated by the Pratt Chamber of Commerce, which formed a committee in the late 1920s specifically to facilitate the construction of a large new hotel. Seen as a potentially valuable asset for the community, the hotel was financed in part through a public subscription campaign, and constructed on land provided by the Chamber. The Pratt Hotel Company owned and operated the hotel and hired Wichita architect Samuel S. Voigt and Kansas City contractor Webster L. Elson to design and build the building. Elson not only supervised the rapid construction of the "fire-proof" building, he was a founding member of the Pratt Hotel Company, and he retained an ownership interest in the property for many years. The community hospital was established on the eighth floor of the building in 1932, complete with an operating room and an x-ray machine. Architecturally, the building is significant as an early and sophisticated example of the Art Deco style in central Kansas. The hotel opened as the Hotel Roberts in 1930, and continued under that name until 1959, when it was purchased by Monte Parrish and renamed the Hotel Parrish. In January 2015 it was listed on the National and State Registers of Historic Places for its local significance in the areas of architecture and community planning and development.

During World War II, the nearby Pratt Army Airfield was the first base used for training Boeing B-29 Superfortress bomber crews and also served as a staging area for getting early aircraft combat-ready, in what became known as the Battle of Kansas.

The Miss Kansas Parade and Pageant are held here.

The state headquarters of Kansas Department of Wildlife and Parks was constructed southeast of the town.

Geography
Pratt is located approximately eighty miles west of Wichita.

Climate

Demographics

2010 census
As of the census of 2010, there were 6,835 people, 2,837 households, and 1,713 families living in the city. The racial makeup of the city was 93.3% White, 1.5% African American, 0.6% Native American, 0.4% Asian, 2.3% from other races, and 2.0% from two or more races. Hispanic or Latino people of any race were 6.2% of the population.

There were 2,837 households, of which 27.7% had children under the age of 18 living with them, 46.4% were married couples living together, 10.2% had a female householder with no husband present, 3.8% had a male householder with no wife present, and 39.6% were non-families. 34.4% of all households were made up of individuals, and 16.7% had someone living alone who was 65 years of age or older. The average household size was 2.28 and the average family size was 2.93.

The median age in the city was 39 years. 22.4% of residents were under the age of 18; 12% were between the ages of 18 and 24; 21% were from 25 to 44; 25.2% were from 45 to 64; and 19.5% were 65 years of age or older. The gender makeup of the city was 48.8% male and 51.2% female.

2000 census
As of the census of 2000, there were 6,570 people, 2,839 households, and 1,780 families living in the city. The racial makeup of the city was 94.87% White, 1.00% African American, 0.38% Native American, 0.64% Asian, 0.03% Pacific Islander, 1.95% from other races, and 1.13% from two or more races. Hispanic or Latino people of any race were 3.46% of the population.

There were 2,839 households, out of which 29.3% had children under the age of 18 living with them, 51.3% were married couples living together, 8.9% had a female householder with no husband present, and 37.3% were non-families. 34.1% of all households were made up of individuals, and 16.4% had someone living alone who was 65 years of age or older. The average household size was 2.26 and the average family size was 2.91.

In the city, the population was spread out, with 24.3% under the age of 18, 8.4% from 18 to 24, 24.3% from 25 to 44, 22.0% from 45 to 64, and 20.9% who were 65 years of age or older. The median age was 41 years. For every 100 females, there were 89.9 males. For every 100 females age 18 and over, there were 84.7 males.

The median income for a household in the city was $33,646, and the median income for a family was $42,412. Males had a median income of $31,186 versus $20,640 for females. The per capita income for the city was $17,486. About 7.1% of families and 10.3% of the population were below the poverty line, including 12.8% of those under age 18 and 10.2% of those age 65 or over.

Education

Colleges
 Pratt Community College

Public schools
The community is served by Pratt USD 382 and Skyline USD 438 public school districts.

 Pratt USD 382
 Pratt High School (9-12)
 Liberty Middle School (5-8)
 Southwest Elementary School (PreK-4)
 Haskins Elementary School & Bridges to Learning (K-4)

 Skyline USD 438
 Skyline High School (K-12)

Private schools
 Sacred Heart/Holy Child (PreK-5)
 Our Savior Lutheran Preschool

Media

Radio stations
 KHMY 93.1FM—Hot Adult Contemporary
 KMMM 1290AM—News, Sports, Information, and Music
 KQZQ 98.3FM-Country, Red Dirt Country

Newspaper
 Pratt Tribune

Infrastructure

Transportation

Highways
Pratt is served by U.S. Route 54, U.S. Route 400, and U.S. Route 281. It is also served by K-61.

Bus
Bus service is provided daily eastward to Wichita and westward to Pueblo, Colorado by BeeLine Express (subcontractor of Greyhound Lines).

In popular media
Theodore Bagwell lies low in a Pratt bar in "The Killing Box", an episode of the television series Prison Break.
In Stephen King's The Stand, Nick Andros and Tom Cullen meet the promiscuous, ultimately vicious Julie Lawry at Pratt.

Notable people

 Bill Farmer, voice actor and comedian
 William Marriott, baseball player
 Vera Miles, actress
 John Redwine, physician and politician
 Pearl Farmer Richardson, clubwoman, United Nations promoter
 Charles Stokes, politician
 Brad Ziegler, relief pitcher for Major League Baseball

References

Further reading

External links

 City of Pratt
 Pratt - Directory of Public Officials
 Pratt Chamber of Commerce
 Pratt history
 Pratt city map, KDOT

Cities in Kansas
County seats in Kansas
Cities in Pratt County, Kansas
Populated places established in 1884
1884 establishments in Kansas